Alexis N'Gambi (born 20 January 1982) is a Cameroonian former professional footballer who played as a defender.

Club career
After starting out at the Kadji Sports Academy in his native country, N'Gambi moved to France and signed with Strasbourg in 1999. He spent three seasons with the club's B team, failing to make any league appearance for the senior side. However, N'Gambi made his official debut for Strasbourg in the 2001 Trophée des Champions, playing the entire match, as the team lost 1–4 to Nantes.

In the summer of 2002, N'Gambi was loaned to Ligue 2 club Gueugnon. He eventually signed for the club on a permanent basis in 2003. After two more seasons there, N'Gambi switched to fellow league club Montpellier. He was a regular member of the team's defensive line in the following three years, making 73 league appearances and scoring three goals.

In June 2008, N'Gambi agreed a transfer with Serbian club Partizan, on a three-year contract. He struggled to make an impression at the club, appearing in only two league games, before being released in the 2009 winter transfer window. Shortly after, N'Gambi joined Latvian club Daugava. He switched clubs and countries again in July 2009, this time joining Greek club Panthrakikos.

In early 2010, N'Gambi was linked with Romanian club Astra Ploiești, but the deal never went through. He was then linked with Malaysian side Sarawak FA in late 2011, again without official confirmation.

International career
In March 2001, N'Gambi was selected to represent Cameroon at the 2001 African Youth Championship. He also played for the Cameroon U23s, as they failed to qualify for the 2004 Summer Olympics.

N'Gambi earned one full international cap for his country on 19 November 2008, in a 2–3 friendly loss to South Africa.

Honours
Strasbourg
 Trophée des Champions: Runner-up 2001

References

External links
 
 
 
 

Living people
1982 births
Cameroonian footballers
Association football defenders
Cameroon international footballers
Cameroon youth international footballers
Ligue 2 players
Serbian SuperLiga players
Latvian Higher League players
Super League Greece players
Kadji Sports Academy players
RC Strasbourg Alsace players
FC Gueugnon players
Montpellier HSC players
FK Partizan players
FK RFS players
Panthrakikos F.C. players
Cameroonian expatriate footballers
Cameroonian expatriate sportspeople in France
Cameroonian expatriate sportspeople in Greece
Cameroonian expatriate sportspeople in Serbia
Expatriate footballers in France
Expatriate footballers in Greece
Expatriate footballers in Latvia
Expatriate footballers in Serbia